Nikolay Aleksandrovich Deryugin (30 April 1959) is a Georgian basketball player who competed in the 1980 Summer Olympics for the Soviet Union and won a bronze medal.

References

1959 births
Living people
People from Kutaisi
Basketball players at the 1980 Summer Olympics
Centers (basketball)
FIBA World Championship-winning players
Medalists at the 1980 Summer Olympics
Olympic basketball players of the Soviet Union
Olympic bronze medalists for the Soviet Union
Olympic medalists in basketball
Men's basketball players from Georgia (country)
Soviet men's basketball players
Sportspeople from Kutaisi
1982 FIBA World Championship players
Expatriate sportspeople from Georgia (country) in Hungary
Expatriate sportspeople from Georgia (country) in Slovakia